The Margules activity model is  a simple thermodynamic model for the excess Gibbs free energy of a liquid mixture introduced in 1895 by Max Margules. After Lewis had introduced the concept of the activity coefficient, the model could be used to derive an expression for the activity coefficients   of a compound i in a liquid,  a measure for the deviation from ideal solubility, also known as Raoult's law.

In chemical engineering the Margules Gibbs free energy model for liquid mixtures is better known as the Margules activity or activity coefficient model. Although the model is old it has the characteristic feature to describe extrema in the activity coefficient, which modern models like NRTL and Wilson cannot.

Equations

Excess Gibbs free energy 
Margules  expressed the intensive excess Gibbs free energy of a binary liquid mixture as a power series of the mole fractions xi:

In here the A, B are constants, which are derived from regressing experimental phase equilibria data.
Frequently the B and higher order parameters are set to zero. The leading term  assures that the excess Gibbs energy becomes zero at x1=0 and x1=1.

Activity coefficient 
The activity coefficient of component i is found by differentiation of the excess Gibbs energy towards xi. 
This yields, when applied only to the first term and using the Gibbs–Duhem equation,:

In here A12 and A21 are constants which are equal to the logarithm of the limiting activity coefficients:  and  respectively.

When , which implies molecules of same molecular size but different polarity, the equations reduce to the one-parameter Margules activity model:

In that case the activity coefficients cross at x1=0.5 and the limiting activity coefficients are equal.  When A=0 the model reduces to the ideal solution, i.e. the activity of a compound is equal to its concentration (mole fraction).

Extrema 

It is easily seen that when A12=0 and A21>0  that a maximum in the activity coefficient of compound 1 exists at x1=1/3. Obvious, the activity coefficient of compound 2 goes at this concentration through a minimum as a result of the Gibbs-Duhem rule.

The binary system Chloroform(1)-Methanol(2) is an example of a system that shows a maximum in the activity coefficient of Chloroform. The parameters for a description at 20 °C are A12=0.6298 and A21=1.9522. This gives a minimum in the activity of Chloroform at  x1=0.17.

In general, for the case A=A12=A21, the larger parameter A, the more the binary systems deviates from Raoult's law; i.e. ideal solubility. When A>2 the system starts to demix in two liquids at 50/50 composition; i.e. plait point is at 50 mol%. Since:

For asymmetric binary systems, A12≠A21, the liquid-liquid separation always occurs for 

Or equivalently:

The plait point is not located at 50 mol%. It depends on the ratio of the limiting activity coefficients.

Recommended values 
An extensive range of recommended values for the Margules parameters can be found in the literature. Selected values are provided in the table below.

See also
 Van Laar equation

Literature

External links
Ternary systems Margules
Physical chemistry
Thermodynamic models